Philip Silver (1909–1999), of New York City, was a philatelist who specialized in the field of air mail stamps, known as aerophilately. He studied air mail stamps and postal history, and wrote extensively on the subject.

Philatelic literature
Silver co-authored “Eleanor and Franklin D. Roosevelt Stamps of the World “(1965) with philatelist Jan Bart. He contributed to the Scott's Specialized U.S. Catalogue as well as to the Sanabria Air Mail Catalogue. And, for a number of years, he edited The Aerophilatelists Annals.

Philatelic activity
At the Collectors Club of New York he held every office in the club, including treasurer, secretary, vice president, president, and trustee. He participated in various capacities at numerous philatelic exhibitions, and was also a trustee of the Philatelic Foundation.

Honors and awards
Because of his extensive work in the field of philately and aerophilately, he received considerable recognition. He was presented with the Richard S. Bohn Memorial Award from Aero Philatelists, Inc. in 1965, the Award for Contributions to Aerophilately from the Metropolitan Air Post Society 1971, the Lichtenstein Memorial Award in 1972, the Gatchell Literature Award from AAMS in 1978, and the FISA Medal in 1978. He signed the Roll of Distinguished Philatelists in 1978 and received the Luff Award for Distinguished Philatelic Research in 1979. He was elected to the American Philatelic Society Hall of Fame in 2002.

See also
 Philately
 Philatelic literature

References

1909 births
1999 deaths
Philatelic literature
American philatelists
Writers from New York City
Signatories to the Roll of Distinguished Philatelists
American Philatelic Society